Qiao Chuanxi (born 1954 in Shou County, Anhui Province) is the current Chairwoman of Chinese People's Political Consultative Conference (CPPCC) Zhejiang Provincial Committee. Qiao joined the Chinese Communist Party in 1973.

References 

Living people
1954 births
Chinese Communist Party politicians from Anhui
Politicians from Huainan
People's Republic of China politicians from Anhui
All-China Women's Federation people